The men's light middleweight (71 kg/156.2 lb) Thai-Boxing division at the W.A.K.O. European Championships 2006 in Skopje was the sixth heaviest of the male Thai-Boxing tournaments and involved ten fighters.  Each of the matches was three rounds of two minutes each and were fought under Thai-Boxing rules.

As there were too few men for a tournament of sixteen, eight of the men went straight into the quarter finals.  The tournament winner was Dominic Brown of Great Britain who defeated fellow  Rizvan Isaev in the final to claim gold.  Defeated semi finalists Ile Risteski from host nation Macedonia and Milos Mihaljevic from Serbia won bronze.  There were also several notable names that went out in the early stages with K-1 MAX regional champion José Reis losing in the 1st round and 2004 European champion Vadzim Mazanik going out in the quarter finals.

Results

Key

See also
List of WAKO Amateur European Championships
List of WAKO Amateur World Championships
List of male kickboxers

References

External links
 WAKO World Association of Kickboxing Organizations Official Site

W.A.K.O. European Championships 2006 (Skopje)